Dayenne Proença Mesquita (born September 23, 1985), best known as Day Mesquita, is a Brazilian actress who played the lead role in two telenovelas.

Career
Born in Telêmaco Borba, before becoming an actress, Dayenne Mesquita studied theater, classic ballet and jazz, and because of that, she won the role of the lead antagonist, Amanda Vasconcelos in 2007 Rede Bandeirantes' telenovela Dance Dance Dance.

After playing the lead role in an episode of Lendas Urbanas, in 2008, she was cast in the lead role as Eliana Vilela, a character who falls in love with her adoptive brother, in 2009 SBT's telenovela Vende-se um Véu de Noiva.

She guest starred in two Rede Globo telenovelas after that, Morde e Assopra in 2010, and A Vida da Gente in 2011. Dayenne Mesquita played the lawyer Stela in the 2012 telenovela Cheias de Charme She played Fernanda in the 2013 telenovela Além do Horizonte.

Dayenne Mesquita played the young Yunet in the first phase of the 2015 telenovela Os Dez Mandamentos. She played Ioná in the 2016 telenovela A Terra Prometida.

Mesquita has acted in religious roles, including playing the wife of Edir Macedo in the biopic Nada a Perder and Mary Magdalene in the TV series Jesus. Although born into a Roman Catholic family, Mesquita now follows Buddhist philosophy.

Filmography

References

Living people
1985 births
People from Telêmaco Borba
Brazilian telenovela actresses
Brazilian Buddhists
Former Roman Catholics